Stephen Edward Clark (born June 17, 1943) is an American former competition swimmer, Olympic champion, and former world record-holder.

At the 1960 Summer Olympics in Rome, Clark swam for the first-place U.S. relay teams in the preliminary heats of the men's 4×200-meter freestyle relay and men's 4×100-meter medley relay.  Both American relay teams won gold medals, but Clark was ineligible for a medal under the Olympic swimming rules in effect in 1960 because he did not compete in the event finals.

He won his first international gold medal at the 1963 Pan American Games in São Paulo, Brazil, winning the men's 100-metre freestyle in a time of 54.7 seconds, and narrowly edging American swimmer Steven Jackman (54.8 seconds).

When Tokyo, Japan hosted the 1964 Summer Olympics, Clark won three gold medals as a member of the winning U.S. relay teams in the 4×100-meter freestyle, 4×200-meter freestyle, and 4×100-meter medley events.

Clark attended Los Altos (California) High School and Yale University, where he swam for coach Philip Moriarty's Yale Bulldogs swimming and diving team in National Collegiate Athletic Association (NCAA) and Ivy League competition.  As a senior, he was the Yale swim team captain; he graduated from Yale with his bachelor's degree in 1964.  In 2005, he donated one of his three Olympic gold medals to his alma mater.

Clark was inducted into the International Swimming Hall of Fame as an "Honor Swimmer" in 1966.

See also
 List of members of the International Swimming Hall of Fame
 List of multiple Olympic gold medalists
 List of multiple Olympic gold medalists at a single Games
 List of Olympic medalists in swimming (men)
 List of Yale University people
 World record progression 100 metres freestyle
 World record progression 4 × 100 metres freestyle relay
 World record progression 4 × 100 metres medley relay
 World record progression 4 × 200 metres freestyle relay

References

External links

 
 

1943 births
Living people
American male freestyle swimmers
World record setters in swimming
Harvard Law School alumni
Olympic gold medalists for the United States in swimming
Pan American Games gold medalists for the United States
Sportspeople from Oakland, California
Swimmers at the 1960 Summer Olympics
Swimmers at the 1963 Pan American Games
Swimmers at the 1964 Summer Olympics
Yale Bulldogs men's swimmers
Medalists at the 1964 Summer Olympics
Pan American Games medalists in swimming
Medalists at the 1963 Pan American Games